Antischism was an American crust punk band formed in 1988 in Columbia, South Carolina. Antischism broke up and then reformed in Austin, Texas, as Initial State. Cooper moved to Savannah, Georgia, and played in Damad (now Kylesa), In/Humanity, Karst, and Chronicle A/D.

Members

Final line-up
Lyz Mueller - vocals (1988–1991; 1993–1994)
Kevin Byrd - guitar (1988–1991; 1993–1994)
Allan Mozingo - bass (1993–1994)
Scott Cooper - drums, vocals (1988–1994)

Past members
Brent - vocals (1991)
Matt - bass (1988–1991)

Discography

As Antischism
Albums
 Still Life, Allied Recordings (1991)

EPs
 All Their Money Stinks of Death", Manifest Soundworks (1988)
 End of Time, Stereonucleosis Records (1989)

Compilations
 Discography CD, Selfless Records (1995)
 Antischism (Discography) CD/2XLP, Prank Records (1998)

Live
 Live in the Studio, Selfless Records, Steronucleosis Records (1990)
 Thinning the Herd - Live split with Subvert, Mind Control Records (1990)

As Initial State
 Abort the Soul'', Clearview Records (1994)

References

American crust and d-beat groups
Hardcore punk groups from South Carolina